
Gmina Kobylanka is a rural gmina (administrative district) in Stargard County, West Pomeranian Voivodeship, in north-western Poland.

Villages
Gmina Kobylanka contains the villages and settlements of Bielkowo, Cisewo, Gajęcki Ług, Jęczydół, Kałęga, Kobylanka, Kunowo, Miedwiecko, Morawsko, Morzyczyn, Motaniec, Niedźwiedź, Rekowo, Reptowo, Wielichówko, Zagość and Zieleniewo.

Neighbouring gminas
Gmina Kobylanka is bordered by the towns of Stargard and Szczecin, and by the gminas of Goleniów, Stare Czarnowo and Stargard.

References
Polish official population figures 2006

Kobylanka
Stargard County